Miloslav Navrátil (born 25 February 1958) is a Czech professional darts player who plays in Professional Darts Corporation (PDC) events.

Navrátil won the 2007 PDC World East European Qualifying Event beating fellow countryman Petr Tous in the final. It earned him a place in the 2008 PDC World Darts Championship. He defeated Filipino Rizal Barellano 5-0 in the preliminary round and faced Andy Jenkins in the first round, eventually losing 3-2. He earned £4,000 for his efforts, but since then he has only managed to earn £325 over nine tournaments. He failed to qualify for the inaugural European Darts Championship and also failed to qualify for the 2009 PDC World Darts Championship.

External links
Profile and stats on Darts Database

1958 births
Czech darts players
Living people
British Darts Organisation players
Professional Darts Corporation associate players